Manohar Pandey is an upcoming Bollywood film directed by Kaushik Ganguly and starring Saurabh Shukla, Raghubir Yadav, and Supriya Pathak. It is the first Hindi-language film for Kaushik Ganguly. The story is a romantic drama set against the backdrop of COVID-19 pandemic.

The film is produced by Nispal Singh and Surinder Singh under the banner Surinder Films.

Cast 

 Saurabh Shukla
 Raghubir Yadav
 Supriya Pathak
 Sudipta Chakraborty

Production 
Filming began in January 2021.

References 

Upcoming Indian films
Upcoming films